The Making of a Lady is a television film based on the 1901 novel The Making of a Marchioness by Frances Hodgson Burnett that uses a screenplay adaptation by Kate Brooke. The film premiered in 2012 on ITV in Britain and was subsequently broadcast on PBS in the United States in 2014. Directed by Richard Curson Smith, the film stars Lydia Wilson as Emily, Linus Roache as Lord James Walderhurst, Joanna Lumley as Lady Maria Byrne, and James D'Arcy as Captain Alec Osborn.

References

External links

2012 television films
2012 films
Films based on American novels
Films based on British novels
Films based on works by Frances Hodgson Burnett